Standartny is a rural locality (a settlement) in Krasnoye Rural Settlement, Sredneakhtubinsky District, Volgograd Oblast, Russia. The population was 229 as of 2010. There are 7 streets.

Geography 
Standartny is located 7 km east of Srednyaya Akhtuba (the district's administrative centre) by road. Zayar is the nearest rural locality.

References 

Rural localities in Sredneakhtubinsky District